Thync is a venture-backed startup that developed a non-invasive, neurostimulation technology that targets the autonomic nervous system.   The company launched the first electronic  wearable device to increase energy and lower stress in 2015.  Its makers claim the device works by neurostimulation techniques such as  TENS.   In 2017, Thync exited the consumer health market and focused all efforts on the development of a bioelectronic therapy to treat moderate psoriasis.

References

External links 
 Company website

Wearable devices